Blennidus insularis is a species of ground beetle in the subfamily Pterostichinae. It was described by Boheman in 1858.

References

Blennidus
Beetles described in 1858